Christophe Moni (born 15 January 1972, in Nice, France) is an ex professional rugby player who played for Rugby Nice Côte d'Azur Université-Racing, RC Toulon, Stade Français and France. He is currently the head coach for the ambitious Rugby Nice Côte d'Azur Université-Racing.

Honours
 Stade Français
French Rugby Union Championship/Top 14: 1997–98, 1999–2000, 2002–03, 2003–04

References

External links
Club playing profile.

1972 births
Living people
French rugby union players
RC Toulonnais players
Rugby Nice Côte d'Azur players
French rugby union coaches
France international rugby union players